David Henry Halford Coventry (born 2 October 1969, Wellington) is a New Zealand born author and musician. Published in six different languages, his debut novel, The Invisible Mile (2015), was the winner of the 2016 Hubert Church Award for Fiction, shortlisted for both the Ockham New Zealand Book Award and the Sports Book Awards in the United Kingdom. His work has been compared to that of Don DeLillo, Toni Morrison and Thomas Mann. Coventry's second novel, Dance Prone, explores trauma, art and 1980s' post-hardcore punk rock. It was published in 2020.

Education 
A former musician, sound engineer and film archivist, Coventry attended Hutt Valley High School from 1983 to 1986, has a BA in English literature and Religious studies (Victoria University of Wellington, 2000), an Honours Degree in English Literature (VUW, 2001) and a Masters in Creative Writing from the International Institute of Modern Letters (VUW, 2010). He lives in Wellington, New Zealand.

The Invisible Mile 
His novel, The Invisible Mile, set during the 1928 Tour de France, has been well received in each of the territories it has been published. It was described in the Sydney Morning Herald as its pick of the Week: "David Coventry's poetic odyssey relates ... with symbolic force and poetic finesse." The New York Times included it in its book of the week section, stating the book is "Gorgeous.... Coventry's brooding narrative, in varying parts philosophical action-adventure, travelogue, family drama, war chronicle and psychological puzzler, is suffused with the ever-querying perspective of its haunted central character." It has been variously described as a "truly extraordinary first novel"[17]. "A dream to read, in all senses of the word.... A trance-like account of the 1928 Tour de France . . . The writing is fierce, a bravura mix of narcissism, masochism and lyricism grounded in the honesty of the unnamed rider's journey into his self and the dawning realisation that the race has become a grand metaphor for the trauma of World War I." Brian Clearkin at Landfall wrote: "a brilliant tour de force of writing talent and style that richly rewards the reader. [P]laces David Coventry among the elite of New Zealand authors."

In regard to the symbolic drive of the novel, Coventry has stated in interview: "The book is not trying to be a metaphor for the war, but for remembering the war."  Indeed, the novel creates its own legends around the riders and pays homage to ancestral competitors.

Awards and appearances 
Coventry was the 2015 recipient of the Todd New Writer's Bursary. He appeared at the 2016 Edinburgh International Book Festival, The International Festival of Authors in Toronto (2017), the New Zealand Festival's Writer's Week in session with Lloyd Geering (2016), the Auckland Writers Festival (2016), and the Nelson Arts Festival (2016).

Literary works 

 The Invisible Mile (2015)
 Dance Prone (2020)

Music and engineering 
As a sound engineer he has produced works for the experimental groups Thela, La Gloria and Empirical The later pair as a contributing musician.

References

External links

1969 births
Living people
New Zealand male short story writers
21st-century New Zealand novelists
International Institute of Modern Letters alumni
People from Wellington City
21st-century New Zealand short story writers
New Zealand male novelists